Patrick Desmond Carl Alexander Guinness, KCEG KLJ (born 1 August 1956 in Dublin) is an Irish historian and author and one of the heirs of the Guinness business dynasty. Son of Desmond and Mariga Guinness (born Hermione Maria-Gabrielle von Urach), he was educated at Winchester College and Trinity College Dublin. He is a financial analyst. He is a former representative of Sotheby's in Ireland.

Historian
An historian, Patrick Guinness wrote the first biography of Arthur Guinness, the founder of the Guinness Brewery dynasty. He has lectured on genetic genealogy relating to the early Irish dynasties and Viking Ireland, and has sponsored academic research on Irish genetics. He was a council member of the County Kildare Archaeological Society (2004–2014).

He has produced monographs on the early history of the Friendly Brothers of St Patrick in Kildare, 1758–91; on the depositions from Kildare on the outbreak of the Irish Rebellion of 1641; and on the Irish Jacobite ancestry of the Mitford family (privately published). In 2016 he addressed the FT Weekend Oxford Literary Festival.

Family
His daughter, by his first marriage to Liz Casey, is model Jasmine Guinness. He married, in 1990, Louise Arundel and the couple have four children: Celeste, Tom, Lily and George.

Through his maternal great-grandfather, the 2nd Duke of Urach, he is a potential claimant to the medieval Kingdom of Jerusalem, the Kingdom of Lithuania and to the Principality of Monaco (see Monaco succession crisis of 1918). In 2015 he gave a lecture on Irish history at the Princess Grace Irish Library in Monaco.

Partly because of previous family involvements, he is a trustee of the Iveagh Trust social housing provider, and is a former president of the Irish Georgian Society.

Honours
In September 2010, he became a Knight of Justice of the Military and Hospitaller Order of St. Lazarus of Jerusalem at a ceremony in St. Patrick's Cathedral in Dublin. In 2013, he was made a Knight Commander of the Order of the Eagle of Georgia by Prince David Bagrationi Mukhran Batonishvili, head of the Royal House of Georgia.

On 10 March 2015 the Texas Senate passed a resolution sponsored by Senator Kirk Watson welcoming Guinness to the Texas State Capitol.

Ancestry

References

1956 births
Living people
Irish male non-fiction writers
People educated at Winchester College
Alumni of Trinity College Dublin
Patrick
Writers from Dublin (city)